Hohlstein is a mountain of Bavaria, Germany.

References  
 

Mountains of Bavaria
Bohemian Forest